or simply Yunogō is a hot spring town located in Mimasaka city of Okayama Prefecture, Japan. The waters of the Yunogo hot springs (onsen in Japanese) are a mixture of sodium chloride and calcium chloride, with the amount of discharge at 540 L/min. The waters are said to have healing effects on those suffering from chronic digestive disorders, nerve pain, rheumatism, arthralgia, chronic feminine problems, and skin problems.

History 

Yunogo Onsen is known as “Sagi no-yu,” or hot water of the heron (sagi is the Japanese word for egret or heron) because 1,200 years ago a Buddhist high priest named En-nin-houshi discovered an injured heron bathing its wounded leg in the waters of a hot spring in Yunogo.  This is how the special healing powers of these waters were discovered, and they now have evolved into a spot where people come to relax and enjoy the waters. There is a statue of En-nin with a heron outside of the “Yunogo Sagi Onsen-kan,” the public bathhouse created in the exact spot where the heron's hot spring was discovered.

Events 
 Night Time Cherry Blossom Watching - Early April - The night time cherry blossom watching bus tour to Tsuyama Castle (Kakuzan Park.) This is one of the best cherry blossom viewing spots in western Japan. (bus: 30 min. one way)
 Koinobori (carp streamer) - Early April to early May - 30 koinobori are flown from the “You-ragi Bridge” on the Yoshino River.
 Mimasaka Furusato Summer Festival, Firework Show - Early July - Many night vendor stalls open at the time of festival, alongside a firework show.
 Yu-jinja Shrine Autumn Festival - Middle of October - Hoping for fertility, people carrying miniature shrines (mikoshi) and danjiri walk around the area in Yunogo.
 Decorative Illumination - Early December to early January - Decorations illuminate the spring resort area in the winter night.

Points of Interest 
 You-ragi Bridge Fountain - A  fountain in the image of a white heron stands as a symbol of Yunogo Onsen. The fountain illuminates during nighttime.
 Japan Museum of Contemporary Toy & Hall of Music Box - More than 100-year-old music boxes and wind-up dolls, as well as the toys made after 1950 are exhibited.
 Yunogo Onsen Train Model & Retro Toy House - Diorama of train models and classic toys are collected here.
 Ohyama Observatory - A vast and panoramic view of Yunogo Onsen and the Chūgoku Mountains can be seen from this observatory.
 Roadside station, Saisai-jaya - The delicacies of Sakushu, black soybeans and other processed foods, as well as local foods and flowers of the season can be purchased here.

Access 
By Bus: 1 hour and 40 min. from JR Okayama St. by bus headed to “Yunogo Onsen”. Get off the bus at “Yunogo.”  40 min. from Tsuyama St. of the JR Tsuyama Line by bus headed to “Yunogo Onsen.” Get off the bus at “Yunogo.”
By Car: 10 min. from Mimasaka IC of Chugoku Express Way

References

External links 

 Official Yunogo Onsen Town Homepage (Japanese)
 Official Okayama Prefecture Tourism Information Homepage

Hot springs of Okayama Prefecture
Spa towns in Japan
Tourist attractions in Okayama Prefecture
Mimasaka, Okayama